Suhartoyo (born 15 October 1959) is currently a justice of the Constitutional Court of Indonesia. Alongside I Dewa Gede Palguna, Suhartoyo was chosen by President Joko Widodo to replace outgoing Justice Ahmad Fadlil Sumadi in January 2015. A former judge from the Denpasar High Court, Suhartoyo's appointment caused controversy due to criticism from the Judicial Commission of Indonesia over his lenience on a Bank Indonesia liquidity scandal when he was serving on the South Jakarta District Court.

Suhartoyo joined the majority of the Court in ruling that parts of the 2010 Clemency Law were unconstitutional. Specifically, Suhartoyo explained the Court's view that the law's attempt to limit clemency appeals to within only one year of conviction conflicted with the Constitution of Indonesia and thus invalidated said parts of the law in question.

References

Justices of the Constitutional Court of Indonesia
21st-century Indonesian judges
Living people
1959 births